Kristian Michael Shaw Fulton (born September 3, 1998) is an American football cornerback for the Tennessee Titans of the National Football League (NFL). He played college football at LSU and was drafted by the Titans in the second round of the 2020 NFL Draft.

Early life and high school career
Fulton was born and grew up in New Orleans, Louisiana and attended Archbishop Rummel High School, where he played football and ran track. He was named the New Orleans area Defensive Player of the Year by The New Orleans Advocate as a junior after finishing the season with 11 interceptions, 27 tackles and eight passes defended despite missing three games due to injury. Fulton was named first-team Class 5A All-State as a senior and also was invited to play in the 2016 Under Armour All-America Game. Fulton was rated a five star recruit by 247 Sports and given a four star rating Rivals, Scout and ESPN and was rated a consensus top-5 prospect at the cornerback position. He committed to play college football at Louisiana State University over Florida and Arkansas. Fulton was also named first-team All-State in track as a senior in the 300 meters hurdles.

College career

Fulton appeared in three games as a freshman, making two tackles. Following the season, Fulton was suspended by the NCAA for two seasons after he tampered with a drug test for performance enhancing drugs on February 2, 2017. He appealed the decision, arguing that he believed that the test was for recreational narcotics, but the initial appeal was denied in March 2017. Fulton sat out the entirety of the 2017 season, but remained with the team and participated in daily practices. Fulton then filed a second appeal after hiring an attorney arguing that proper drug testing protocol was not followed. The second appeal was also originally denied by a panel of NCAA officials on August 9, 2018, but the decision was overturned on August 23.

Fulton entered his junior season as a starter at cornerback for the Tigers, despite not having played in a game in 18 months. He started the first ten games of the season for LSU before suffering a season ending ankle injury against Arkansas and finished the season with 25 tackles (one for loss), an interception, and nine passes defended. Entering his senior season, Fulton was named a preseason All-American by the Associated Press and the third-best defensive back in the nation by USA Today. He finished the season with 38 tackles, one interception and 14 passes defended as LSU won the 2020 National Championship.

Professional career

Fulton was drafted by the Tennessee Titans with the 61st overall pick in the second round of the 2020 NFL Draft. He signed his four-year rookie contract on July 27, 2020. Fulton made his NFL debut in the Titans season opener against the Denver Broncos, making four tackles. In Week 2 against the Jacksonville Jaguars, Fulton recorded his first career interception off a pass thrown by Gardner Minshew and returned it for 44 yards during the 33–30 win.

In Week 3 against the Minnesota Vikings, Fulton recorded his first career sack on Kirk Cousins during the 31–30 win. He was placed on the reserve/COVID-19 list by the team on October 1, 2020, and activated on October 13. He was placed on injured reserve on October 31 with a knee injury. He was activated off of injured reserve on December 15, 2020.

Fulton entered the 2021 season as a starting cornerback for the Titans. He started the first five games before suffering a hamstring injury in Week 5. He was placed on injured reserve on October 18, 2021. He was activated from injured reserve on November 13, 2021.

References

External links
LSU Tigers bio
Tennessee Titans bio

Living people
1998 births
Players of American football from New Orleans
American football cornerbacks
LSU Tigers football players
Under Armour All-American football players
Archbishop Rummel High School alumni
Tennessee Titans players